Dendroma is a genus of foliage-gleaners, birds in the ovenbird family Furnariidae. It contains the following species:

 Chestnut-winged foliage-gleaner, Dendroma erythroptera
 Buff-fronted foliage-gleaner, Dendroma rufa

References

 
Bird genera
Taxa named by William John Swainson